What You Are is a solo album from Scottish rock musician Ricky Ross. It was the first solo album Ross released after the breakup of the band he fronted, Deacon Blue.

The album's music marked a significant departure from the sound of Deacon Blue, introducing a harder edge and an increased emphasis on aggressive guitar work.

Track listing 
All songs written by Ricky Ross, except where noted:

  "Good Evening Philadelphia" – 3:16
  "Icarus" – 2:36
  "Cold Easter" (Ross, Mick Slaven) – 2:52
  "What You Are" – 4:42
  "Radio On" – 4:08
  "When Sinners Fall" – 4:37
  "Jack Singer" – 3:25
  "The Lovers" (Ross, Slaven) – 4:10
  "Wake Up and Dream" – 3:50
  "Rosie Gordon Lies So Still" – 4:11
  "Promise You Rain" – 3:42
  "Love Isn't Hard It's Strong" – 3:18

Personnel
 Ricky Ross - vocals, keyboards, guitar
 Mick Slaven - guitar
 Jeff "Skunk" Baxter - guitar, pedal steel
 Dan Root - guitar
 Mark Harris - bass
 Scott Crago - drums, percussion
 Joey Waronker - drums
 Patrick Warren - chamberlin
 John Wittenberg - violin
 Xiou Niu Ho - violin
 Helene Wittenberg - viola
 Glenn Grab - cello
 Lorraine McIntosh - backing vocals on "Wake Up and Dream"

Charts

References

1996 albums
Ricky Ross (musician) albums